Carlo Cattaneo  was an Italian philosopher, writer, and activist. 

Carlo Cattaneo  may also refer to:

 Carlo Cattaneo (admiral), Italian admiral during World War II
 Carlo Cattaneo (mathematician), Italian academic and one of the general relativity theorists and mathematical physicists
 University Carlo Cattaneo, university located in Castellanza, Italy